Atractus flammigerus, is a species of colubrid snake. It is endemic to the eastern part of the Guiana Shield. It is also known as the flaming ground snake.

Habitat and geographic range
Atractus flammigerus is found in the eastern part of the Guiana Shield in Suriname, Brazil, and French Guiana. It occurs in lowland rainforest at elevations below .

References

Atractus
Snakes of South America
Reptiles of Brazil
Reptiles of French Guiana
Reptiles of Suriname
Reptiles described in 1827
Taxa named by Friedrich Boie